Kotow may refer to:

Kotów, Podkarpackie Voivodeship, A village in Poland
Kowtow, act of prostration in Imperial Chinese protocol